The White Album is the first remix album by Australian contemporary worship music band Hillsong United. It was released on 4 March 2014. The album reached No. 48 on the Billboard 200 and also appeared on its component charts: No. 1 on Top Electronic Albums, No. 4 on Top Christian Albums and No. 22 on Top Digital Albums.

Background 
On 21 January, Hillsong UNITED posted the official cover artwork for the album, and announced that it would be available for Upfront members first. They posted "Excited to announce something new for us," making reference to their first remix project ever.

On 24 January, they announced the first remix available (on Upfront) "Like An Avalanche".

On 30 January, they posted the official track listing by uploading the back cover of the album.

The songs were made available for free. It is available from their website for $15.

Reception 

AllMusic's David Jeffries reviewed The White Album and found it was "Built for the 20-plus crowd that might crave a little synth with their CCM". The project takes the group's favourite track and "hands them over to producers and DJs for repurposing. The results are either expected yet spot-on or surprising plus very welcome". In May 2014 Stephen Curry of Cross Rhythms declared it "contains remixes of popular Hillsong United songs from various projects, giving them a new sound or twist in the process".

Track listing

Charts

References 

Hillsong United albums
2014 albums